Canthumeryx is an extinct genus of primitive giraffid artiodactyls. It is the close ancestor of giraffes.

References 

The Evolution of Artiodactyls by Donald R. Prothero and Scott E. Foss  
Mammoths, Sabertooths, and Hominids by Jordi Agusti and Mauricio Anton  
The Mammals of the Southern African Sub-region by J. D. Skinner and Christian T. Chimimba  
Classification of Mammals by Malcolm C. McKenna and Susan K. Bell  
 

Prehistoric giraffes
Miocene even-toed ungulates
Miocene mammals of Africa
Prehistoric even-toed ungulate genera